V Ezhumalai (ta: வி.ஏழுமலை) is an Indian politician and Member of Parliament elected from Tamil Nadu. He is elected to the Lok Sabha from Arani constituency as an Anna Dravida Munnetra Kazhagam candidate in 2014 election.

He is the former party MLA of Gingee constituency and as of 2014 he is the district secretary of Villupuram District (North) MGR Mantram. He is a native of Annamangalam near Gingee. There is a rumor that he is dismissed from Party in 2021 Election

References 

All India Anna Dravida Munnetra Kazhagam politicians
Living people
India MPs 2014–2019
Lok Sabha members from Tamil Nadu
Members of the Tamil Nadu Legislative Assembly
1955 births